The 2017 Pacific Rugby League Tests, known commercially as the Mesh & Bar Pacific Tests, are a group of rugby league test matches that were played on 6 May 2017 at Campbelltown Stadium in Sydney, Australia. Papua New Guinea played against the Cook Islands; Fiji against Tonga; and England against Samoa.

The triple header at the 20,000 capacity Campbelltown Stadium attracted an almost capacity crowd of 18,271.

Squads

ANZAC test

The 2017 Anzac Test was a rugby league test match played between Australia and New Zealand at Canberra Stadium. It was the 18th and last Anzac Test played between the two nations since the first was played under the Super League banner in 1997. The match was played on 5 May 2017.

The Australian team was announced on 26 April, while the New Zealand team was announced on 30 April with the starters and 18th man named on 4 May.

Papua New Guinea vs Cook Islands

Tonga vs Fiji

England vs Samoa

References 

Pacific Rugby League International
Rugby league in Sydney
2017 in Fijian sport
2017 in Tongan sport
2017 in Papua New Guinea rugby league
2017 in English rugby league
2017 in Samoan sport
Rugby league in the Cook Islands